The Netherlands Football League Championship 1897–1898 was contested by ten teams participating in two divisions. The national champion would be determined by a play-off match featuring the winners of the eastern and western football division of the Netherlands. RAP won this year's championship by beating Vitesse Arnhem 4–2.

New entrants
Eerste Klasse East: (new division)
Go Ahead Wageningen, returning after one year of absence (previously participating in the western division)
PW
Vitesse

Eerste Klasse West:
Celeritas
HFC Haarlem

Divisions

Eerste Klasse East

Eerste Klasse West

Championship play-off

|}

RAP won the championship.

References
RSSSF Netherlands Football League Championships 1898-1954
RSSSF Eerste Klasse West
RSSSF Eerste Klasse Oost

Netherlands Football League Championship seasons
1897 in Dutch sport
1898 in Dutch sport